The Living Room is an Australian lifestyle program that is a quadruple winner of the Logie Award for Most Popular Lifestyle Program. The program delves into a range of lifestyle issues including renovations, travel, pet advice, cooking and also includes special guests and studio banter in each episode.

It premiered on Network Ten on 11 May 2012 and airs on Fridays at 7:30 pm.

Series overview

Episodes

Series 1 (2012)

Series 2 (2013)

Series 3 (2014)

Series 4 (2015)

Series 5 (2016)

Series 6 (2017)

Series 7 (2018)

Series 8 (2019)

Series 9 (2020)

Series 10 (2021)

Series 11 (2022)

Specials

References

Network 10 original programming
Living Room episodes, List of The